Martin Johannes Bezuidenhout (born 21 August 1989 in Orkney, South Africa) is a rugby union footballer who most recently played as a hooker with Super Rugby side the  and Currie Cup side the .

He joined  in 2014 on a one-year deal. In July 2014, he extended his contract until the end of 2015.

References

External links

Lions profile
Profile at itsrugby.co.uk

South African rugby union players
Golden Lions players
Lions (United Rugby Championship) players
Stormers players
Rugby union hookers
1989 births
Living people
People from Klerksdorp
Afrikaner people
Southern Kings players
Rugby union players from North West (South African province)